The 2009 Polska Energia Open was a professional tennis tournament played on outdoor red clay courts. It was part of the 2009 ATP Challenger Tour. It took place in Bytom, Poland between 15 and 21 June 2009.

Singles entrants

Seeds

 Rankings are as of May 25, 2009.

Other entrants
The following players received wildcards into the singles main draw:
  Mateusz Kowalczyk
  Michał Przysiężny
  Mateusz Szmigiel
  Bojan Szumański

The following players received entry from the qualifying draw:
  Vasek Pospisil
  Guillaume Rufin
  Artem Smirnov
  Nicolás Todero

Champions

Singles

 Laurent Recouderc def.  Jan Hájek, 6–3, 6–4

Doubles

 Pablo Santos /  Gabriel Trujillo Soler def.  Jan Hájek /  Dušan Karol, 6–3, 7–6(3)

References
Official website
ITF search 
2009 Draws

Polska Energia Open
Clay court tennis tournaments
ZRE Katowice Bytom Open
Polska Energia Open, 2009